Nikola Petković may refer to:
Nikola Petković (footballer, born 1986)
Nikola Petković (footballer, born 1996)
Nikola Petković (footballer, born 2003)